Varsavsky is a surname. Notable people with the surname include:

Carlos Varsavsky (1933–1983), Argentine astrophysicist
Martín Varsavsky (born 1960), Argentine/Spanish telecommunications and new media entrepreneur
Oscar Varsavsky (1920–1976), Argentine mathematician and science administrator